Harold N. "Bus" Saidt (November 11, 1920 – April 8, 1989) was an American sports writer who covered the Philadelphia Phillies, New York Mets, and the New York Yankees for the Trentonian and the Trenton Times.

He was awarded the J. G. Taylor Spink Award by the National Baseball Hall of Fame and Museum in 1992.

References

External links
Baseball Hall of Fame
Social Security Death Record

1920 births
1989 deaths
American sportswriters
Baseball writers
BBWAA Career Excellence Award recipients
20th-century American writers
20th-century American journalists
American male journalists